The Golden Temple Park, or Jindian Park, is a Taoist bronze-tiled temple in Yunnan, China, and is the largest bronze temple in the country. It is located on the Mingfeng Mountains, seven kilometers to the east of Kunming.

History 
The Golden Temple was first built in 1602 during the Ming dynasty. The temple's bronze was initially ordered to be sent from Dongchuan to central China to be used as coinage, but the delivery was cancelled due to an armed conflict. The governor of Yunnan, Chen Yongbing, and Mu Changzuo, the Duke of Guizhou, ordered that the bronze be used to build a temple in imitation of the Taihe Palace and the Golden Temple in the Wudang Mountains of Hubei. The temple was later moved to the Jizu Mountains in western Yunnan. During the reign of the Kangxi Emperor (1662-1722), Wu Sangui, a military general who defected from the Ming dynasty and opened Shanhai Pass for the Manchu invaders, rebuilt the temple and kept the original Hubei design. Over 200 tons of bronze was used in the construction of the temple. The walls were made with cast panels covered with exquisite and diverse designs. Today, the walls have become well-preserved examples of the smelting and casting techniques common in Yunnan during the Qing Dynasty.

In front of the staircase outside the Golden Temple, the wide branched camellias are called "Diechi" (Butterfly Wings). They are covered with thousands of flowers in the depth of winter. The two myrtles close by were planted during the Ming dynasty.

A three-story bell tower lies behind the temple. 2.1 meters tall and 6.7 meters in circumference, the bell itself was cast in 1424 during the reign of the Yongle Emperor in the Ming dynasty. It was previously hung in the Xuanhua Mansion for timekeeping, but was moved Golden Temple during the expansion of Kunming. In recent years, the Temple has been expanded several times when the "Parrot Garden", the "Camellia Garden", and the "Orchid Garden" were added.

References

Notes 

Parks in Yunnan
Taoist temples in China
Religious buildings and structures completed in 1602
1602 establishments in China
Tourist attractions in Kunming